The Letter is a 1940 American crime melodrama directed by William Wyler, and starring Bette Davis, Herbert Marshall and James Stephenson.  The screenplay by Howard E. Koch is based on the 1927 play of the same name by W. Somerset Maugham derived from his own short story. The play was first filmed in 1929, by director Jean de Limur.  The story was inspired by a real-life scandal involving the Eurasian wife of the headmaster of a school in Kuala Lumpur who was convicted in a murder trial after shooting dead a male friend in April 1911. She was pardoned by the local sultan after a public furor.

Plot
On a moonlit tropical night the native workers drowse in their hammocks. A shot is heard; the door of a house opens, and a man stumbles out, followed by a woman who calmly empties her pistol into him, the last few rounds while standing over his body. She is Leslie Crosbie, the wife of a British rubber plantation manager in Malaya; her manservant recognizes the dead man as Geoff Hammond, a well-known member of the expatriot community. Leslie tells the servant to send for the new district officer and her husband Robert, who is loading rubber for shipment. Crosbie returns, delivered by his attorney, a close family friend. Leslie tells the threesome that Hammond "tried to make love to me" and that she killed him to save her honor.

She is placed under arrest, jailed in Singapore, and charged with murder. In spite of this her eventual acquittal seems a foregone conclusion, as the white community not only believes her story but feels she had acted heroically.  Only the attorney, Howard Joyce, harbors suspicion - and has from the start. His concern is raised to alarm when his clerk, Ong Chi Seng, shortly tell him a letter exists that Leslie wrote to Hammond the day of the shooting, imploring him to come that night while Robert was away. 

Ong tells Joyce that the original is in the possession of Hammond's widow, a Eurasian woman who lives in the Chinese quarter.  He shows Joyce a copy, revealing Leslie's clear culpability in her ex-lover's murder, and conveys that the original is for sale, at a staggering price. Joyce then confronts Leslie, who first denies then breaks down and confesses to having written it.  She then cleverly manipulates him into agreeing to buy it back, at the risk of his integrity, career, and possibly more.  Leaving it unspoken, Joyce is clear he’s doing so to spare his friend, a thoroughly decent man who accepts and loves Leslie utterly, not she.

Needing Robert’s consent to buy the letter, Joyce tells him about it, abjectly misrepresenting its content.  He also finesses around its pricetag - $10,000 - which will cost Robert near his last cent. Ong informs Joyce that Hammond's widow demands Leslie come personally to make the payoff, so Joyce arranges for the court to have her released into his custody to "regain her health".

In the Chinese quarter Leslie is confronted by a frighteningly impassive woman seething within her skin, who debases her rival by insisting the faithless murderess come get the letter from her, then throws it at her feet so that she must kowtow to pick it up. 

The evidence successfully suppressed, Joyce's masterful, but halting, closing argument secures Leslie's acquittal.

In the aftermath of the trial Robert announces to Leslie and Joyce that he plans to buy a rubber plantation in Sumatra to give he and Leslie a fresh start.  It will require all his savings, plus a mortgage, but he can hardly contain his excitement.  The collaborators are forced to reveal his dream is wholly impossible.  When Robert hears the price paid for the letter he demands to read it, and is completely devastated to learn not merely that Leslie had lied about the killing but had been shamelessly unfaithful with Hammond for years.

As a party celebrating the acquittal gets underway Leslie steps onto her porch and sees a dagger on the matting, recognizing it instantly as one of a matched set she had seen in the shop where the letter had been retrieved. Immediately aware of the implication, she nevertheless joins the festivities. Soon she is in the arms of the district officer, still as clueless as the night of the shooting, loudly prattling on how brave she had been and proud he is of her as they dance past Robert at the bar.  The words gut the cuckold like a fish.

Leslie retreats to her room and tries to lose herself in her lacework, which has always distracted her mind before.  Robert blusters his friends with his Sumatran fantasy, but collapses in gin and misery.

The lacemaking fails, and Leslie is overcome. Robert enters and offers to forgive her if only she can swear her love. She does, and proclaims she will do all in her power to make him happy. But when he presses a kiss the bitter truth overwhelms her.  Renouncing him, she exclaims, "With all my heart, I still love the man I killed!"

Robert rushes from the room. Leslie looks for the dagger, but it is gone. She recognizes the inevitability of her fate, and ghosts down the garden path toward it.  Outside the gate she comes face to face with the cobra-eyed widow.  Though she would not have struggled, Leslie is grabbed from behind and held by her own manservant while a dagger takes its revenge.

The two murderers attempt to slip away, but are stopped within steps by the flashlight of a policeman, who leads them silently off.

Cast

 Bette Davis as Leslie Crosbie
 Herbert Marshall as Robert Crosbie
 James Stephenson as Howard Joyce
 Frieda Inescort as Dorothy Joyce
 Gale Sondergaard as Mrs. Hammond
 Bruce Lester as John Withers
 Elizabeth Earl as Adele Ainsworth
 Cecil Kellaway as Prescott
 Sen Yung as Ong Chi Seng
 Doris Lloyd as Mrs. Cooper
 Willie Fung as Chung Hi
 Tetsu Komai as Head Boy

Production
The Production Code Administration rejected the original story adaptation that Warner Bros. submitted on the grounds that it contained adultery and unpunished murder, so a new final scene was added in which the widow Hammond takes her revenge. The character of Mrs. Hammond was also changed from Hammond's Chinese mistress to his Eurasian wife to placate the Hays code.

Director William Wyler and star Bette Davis, who had previously worked together on Jezebel, disagreed about the climactic scene in which Leslie admits to her husband she still loves the man she murdered. Davis felt no woman could look at her husband when she admits such a thing. Wyler disagreed, and Davis walked off the set. She later returned and did it Wyler's way, but ever after, Davis insisted her approach would have been better.

Wyler also argued with Warner Bros. head Jack L. Warner over the casting of British actor James Stephenson as attorney Howard Joyce. Warner originally had suggested Stephenson for the role, but after Wyler cast him, the studio head had second thoughts and thought the role was too important to cast an unknown in it. Wyler stood firm, and Stephenson's performance earned him an Oscar nomination.

Herbert Marshall also appeared in the 1929 version, in which he plays the lover who is killed by Leslie. The 1940 film begins with the shooting. The 1929 version opens with the confrontation between Leslie and Geoff that preceded it.

Reception
The film was a huge hit with the public, and received seven Academy Award nominations (for Outstanding Production, Best Director, Best Actress (Davis), Best Supporting Actor (Stephenson), Best Cinematography – Black and White, Best Film Editing, and Best Original Score, but failed to win any.

Critical response
In his review in The New York Times, Bosley Crowther observed, "The ultimate credit for as taut and insinuating a melodrama as has come along this year — a film which extenuates tension like a grim inquisitor's rack—must be given to Mr. Wyler. His hand is patent throughout . . . Miss Davis is a strangely cool and calculating killer who conducts herself with reserve and yet implies a deep confusion of emotions . . . Only the end of The Letter is weak — and that is because of the postscript which the Hays Office has compelled".

Variety magazine wrote, "Never has [the W. Somerset Maugham play] been done with greater production values, a better all-around cast or finer direction. Its defect is its grimness. Director William Wyler, however, sets himself a tempo which is in rhythm with the Malay locale . . . Davis' frigidity at times seems to go even beyond the characterization. On the other hand, Marshall never falters. Virtually stealing these honors in the pic, however, is Stephenson as the attorney, while Sondergaard is the perfect mask-like threat".

Time Out London said in 2012, "A superbly crafted melodrama, even if it never manages to top the moody montage with which it opens - moon scudding behind clouds, rubber dripping from a tree, coolies dozing in the compound, a startled cockatoo - as a shot rings out, a man staggers out onto the verandah, and Davis follows to empty her gun grimly into his body . . . [The] camerawork, almost worthy of Sternberg in its evocation of sultry Singapore nights and cool gin slings, is not matched by natural sounds (on the soundtrack Max Steiner's score does a lot of busy underlining).

The film holds a 100% rating on Rotten Tomatoes based on 15 reviews, with an average rating of 8.40/10.

Accolades

The film is recognized by American Film Institute in these lists:
 2003: AFI's 100 Years...100 Heroes & Villains:
 Leslie Crosbie – Nominated Villain

See also
 Ethel Proudlock case, inspiration for the film
 Pasar Seni station

References

External links

 
 
 
 
 The Letter informational site and DVD review at DVD Beaver (includes images)

Streaming audio
 Letter on Lux Radio Theater: April 21, 1941
 The Letter on Lux Radio Theater: March 6, 1944

1940 films
1940 crime drama films
Adultery in films
American crime drama films
American black-and-white films
Films scored by Max Steiner
American films based on plays
Films based on works by W. Somerset Maugham
Films directed by William Wyler
Films produced by Hal B. Wallis
Films set in Malaysia
Films set in Singapore
Warner Bros. films
1940s English-language films
1940s American films